"Sweet Potatoe Pie" is the second single by American rapper Domino. It was released on March 8, 1994 through Outburst Records. Written by Domino and DJ Battlecat, it was recorded at Skip Saylor in Hollywood and produced by Battlecat.

Released as the follow-up to his smash hit, "Getto Jam", "Sweet Potatoe Pie" also became a top 40 hit, peaking at 27 on the Billboard Hot 100, his final single to do so. The original song used a sample of Soul II Soul's 1989 single "Back to Life (However Do You Want Me)". The official remix entitled the "Sweet Vibes" remix was produced by the Gang of Four and used a sample of "Mysterious Vibes" by The Blackbyrds.

The song also appeared on Def Jam's greatest hits compilation Def Jam Music Group Inc.: 10th Year Anniversary in 1995. It was also later used in the seventh episode, "Gotta Look Up to Get Down", of the fifth season of HBO comedy-drama television series Entourage.

Track listing

A-Side
"Sweet Potatoe Pie" (LP Version)
"Sweet Potatoe Pie" (Radio Version)

B-Side
"Sweet Potatoe Pie" (LP Instrumental)
"Sweet Potatoe Pie" (A Cappella)
"That's Real" (LP Version)

Charts

Weekly charts

Year-end charts

References

External links

1993 songs
1994 singles
Domino (rapper) songs
Def Jam Recordings singles
Songs written by Battlecat (record producer)
Song recordings produced by Battlecat (record producer)